The Nepal Tourism Board (NTB) is the official national tourism organization of Nepal which works towards establishing Nepal as a premier holiday destination to the world. The Board provides platform for vision-drawn leadership for Nepal’s tourism sector by integrating Government commitment with the dynamism of private sector. NTB is promoting Nepal in the domestic and international market and is working toward repositioning the image of the country. It also aims to regulate product development activities. The Board chaired by the Secretary at the Ministry of Tourism and Civil Aviation consists of 11 board members with Five Government representatives, five private sector representatives and the Chief Executive Officer. The CEO of NTB was Dr. Dhananjay Regmi who has been suspended by the Government of Nepal.

History
Nepal Tourism Board is a national organization established in 1998 by an act of Parliament in the form of partnership between the Government of Nepal and private sector tourism industry to develop and market Nepal as an attractive tourist destination. Therefore, making it a pioneer organization made using the PPP model (Public, Private, Partnership).

Tourism Brand
Nepal Lifetime Experiences is the tourism brand of Nepal. “Nepal Lifetime Experiences” is a simple expression that repackages the Nepal brand in a positive light. As the phrase accurately encapsulates the feelings tourists get after visiting Nepal. Nepal as a destination leaves an impression on the visitors as it is unlike any other holiday destination therefore, they take back the experience of lifetime with them to cherish forever.

See also
Hotel association of Nepal

References

Government agencies of Nepal
Tourism agencies
1998 establishments in Nepal
Tourism in Nepal